Theodore Stephen "Ted" Kord is the second Blue Beetle, a superhero who was originally published by Charlton Comics and later acquired by DC Comics. He was created by Steve Ditko and first appeared as a back-up feature in Captain Atom #83 (November 1966), with Gary Friedrich scripting from Ditko's conception and plot.
Fictional characters from Chicago

Publication history and fictional character biography

Charlton Comics
Ted Kord was a genius-level inventor and a gifted athlete, sharing much more in common with the Fox original than did Charlton's earlier reimagining of the character. Kord's signature equipment was his bug-shaped personal aircraft, which he entered and exited typically with a cable suspended from the cockpit. He also generally eschewed personal weaponry, except for a pistol that made a blinding flash of light and, additionally, a strong airblast to gain the advantage when he closed in for hand-to-hand combat.

The character ran as a backup feature in Captain Atom #83–86 (November 1966 – June 1967) before getting his own Blue Beetle title, which ran for 5 issues between June 1967 and November 1968. A sixth issue was produced, but published in the Charlton Portfolio by CPL Gang. The Question ran as a backup series, with the fifth issue featuring a quasi-team-up in which the Blue Beetle story continues in part in the Question tale.

An origin was given in Secret Origins vol. 2, #2, linking him to the original Blue Beetle. Ted was a former student of Dan Garrett, and they were investigating his uncle Jarvis Kord, learning Jarvis was working to create an army of androids to take over Earth; Garrett fought Jarvis, but both were killed in the battle. Garrett died and passed on the responsibility of the alter-ego to Ted, but was not able to pass on the mystical Blue Beetle scarab (a convenient means for Ditko to explain his preference for a power-free character). There was a hint that one android was still left in stasis, but this would remain unresolved until the DC series of the late 1980s.

In the early 1980s, the first issue of Charlton's anthology comic Charlton Bullseye featured a team-up of the Blue Beetle and the Question. Later, AC Comics would publish a story intended for Charlton Bullseye in Americomics #3, and a one-shot of a team-up of all the Charlton "Action Heroes" called the Sentinels of Justice, as the company called its lineup. Upon losing Blue Beetle, AC Comics created a similar character called Scarlet Scorpion.

DC Comics

DC solo series

DC Comics acquired the Charlton heroes in the mid-1980s and used the Crisis on Infinite Earths crossover event to integrate them all into the DC Universe. During this period, Ted Kord had his own Blue Beetle series, written by Len Wein, which ran for 24 issues from June 1986 to May 1988. Also published during this time was Secret Origins #2 (cover illustrated by Gil Kane), which explained the origins and careers of the Ted Kord and Dan Garrett Blue Beetles in the post-Crisis continuity. They would also follow up on the hinted android in stasis from the Charlton series, which would eventually become "Carapax, the Indestructible Man".

In his monthly, solo series, Kord was shown as an industrialist, the owner of KORD Industries, which he took over from his father Thomas Kord and transformed it from a small R & D company to a scientific industry rivaling S.T.A.R. Labs. Upon joining the newly formed Justice League (following the events in the Legends) Ted was more often portrayed as a second string joke. He was short on money, leading to his entering "get-rich-quick" schemes with Booster Gold. A brief appearance in JLA: Year One showed the young Ted working in Kord Industries R&D, where he designed the JLA HQ security system. Upon meeting the heroes, he thought, "Screw the family business. I want to be one of those guys", possibly explaining the company's fluctuating status since he took over. In recent comics, it has been implied that KORD Industries has become a subsidiary of Wayne Enterprises, headed by Bruce Wayne aka Batman.

Joining the Justice League

Kord is probably best known as the wisecracking Blue Beetle of Keith Giffen and J. M. DeMatteis' lighthearted, five-year run on various Justice League of America titles (notably Justice League International), where he was memorably partnered with fellow third-string hero Booster Gold, and the two quickly became best friends. Among fans, they were known collectively as the "Blue and Gold" team. For a while, he grappled with a weight problem, but with sheer determination and coaching from the hero General Glory, as well as competing against Power Girl, he defeated it. After Giffen and DeMatteis left, the series continued to run until Justice League America #113. Dan Jurgens tied "The Death of Superman" storyline into JLA, in which Doomsday left Kord in a coma during his murderous rampage, as well as a six-inch scar on the back of his skull. Kord and Booster Gold both subsequently joined the short-lived Justice League offshoot known as Extreme Justice.

Kord then entered a period of relative obscurity. The miniseries The LAW (Living Assault Weapons) reunited him and the other heroes acquired from Charlton, but the series met with critical disfavor.

Super Buddies

In July 2003, Giffen, DeMatteis, and original JLI artist Kevin Maguire reunited for the six-issue miniseries Formerly Known as the Justice League, where many of the original JLI characters re-teamed with a storefront office. Ted (who had grown in maturity) was an important member of this new team known as the "Super Buddies". The sequel story arc I Can't Believe It's Not the Justice League was initially slated as a second miniseries, but instead ran delayed in JLA: Classified #4–9 (2005).

Ted made several appearances in Birds of Prey, at first as Oracle's internet friend and later in person. It was hinted in several issues that Ted had a crush on Oracle. Ted had gone back to his company, but still had many, many problems with it; problems Oracle tried to help resolve. During this time, it was revealed he had a heart condition (where he had actually experienced multiple heart attacks while in action without noticing), but this did not stop him from assisting when it was needed. After his death, the Birds of Prey visited a statue in Valhalla Cemetery built in his honor; Black Canary revealed that being in the JLA was only fun when Ted was there, and Oracle revealed having had a cyber crush on him.

Infinite Crisis

Death

In the 80-page special Countdown to Infinite Crisis, Kord discovers a revived Checkmate organization headquartered in a Belgian castle fortress where Kord is captured. Maxwell Lord, former bankroller of the JLA, reveals to Blue Beetle to use Checkmate to ensure that metahumans, including superheroes, will be kept under human's surveillance and control. Blue Beetle is then given an ultimatum to join Lord's organization, but refuses with the reply "Rot in hell, Max" to which Lord murders him with a bullet to the head.

That same story had earlier reiterated that Kord had thought the scarab was destroyed back in Blue Beetle vol. 6, #18 (1987); however, it had been rediscovered, untouched, in a temple in Egypt and handed over to Kord. It is unclear as to whether or not this is the same scarab created from a piece of future technology magically infused by Nabu the Wizard in the Time Masters miniseries. Shazam took the scarab upon encountering Kord, fueling speculation about the possibility of the character's return during DC's Infinite Crisis series. This possibility was dashed when it was asked at the Wizard World convention if Kord would ever return, writer Greg Rucka stated: "There was a breeze blowing through his brain, and he was incinerated. How much clearer can it be?"

Fallout

Ted's death precipitated the events of Infinite Crisis. Brother Eye was reorganized and the OMAC project restarted, and Lord was revealed as a villain who took telepathic control of Superman, which led to Wonder Woman killing Lord. Shazam had warned Ted about Lex Luthor who had supposedly straddled the worlds of both magic and science. Events in Infinite Crisis #3 revealed this to be Alexander Luthor Jr., in disguise. Booster Gold returned to the 25th century. He later returned to the present with Skeets to help find Brother Eye. The success of the mission put Booster Gold back into the spotlight and set in motion the events of 52.

One Year Later

The young teenager Jaime Reyes later merges the scarab as the new Blue Beetle. A statue of Kord is displayed in J'onn J'onzz's memorial to fallen Justice League members. When recruiting members for the new Justice League, Superman suggests Booster Gold to which Batman responds: "There are better ways to honor Ted".

Shockwave, the enforcer of the 1000, is sent to destroy buildings of interest to the still active KORD Industries but is stopped by Red Devil and Jaime; the 1000 managed to take over KORD Industries due to the property value plummeting.

In Geoff Johns' 2007/2008 ongoing Booster Gold series, Booster Gold agrees to help Rip Hunter set right the timeline, but at a cost: Rip must help Booster go back and save Ted. Hunter tries to shock Booster Gold into acknowledging the inability to change past "solidified" events, tricking the latter into witnessing Barbara Gordon's crippling assault over and over again. As Booster Gold prepares to accept this fate, a futuristic Blue Beetle appears with Garrett and Jaime in tow to show how to turn the time around Ted's death into "malleable time". Booster Gold betrays Hunter and with the other Blue Beetles' help, rescues Ted from death. The four Blue Beetles escape together in time, the technology used to save him preserving the future events the way they were meant to unfold (thus enabling Jaime's role intact), with the world at large still believing Ted to be deceased. The story arc "Blue and Gold" reveals that this act has altered the present, creating a timeline where Max and the OMACs have turned the world into a police state. The future Blue Beetle is also revealed to actually be the supervillain Black Beetle allied with the Ultra-Humanite, Despero, Per Degaton, and Supernova (under the control of Mister Mind) as the Time Stealers supervillain group. Facing the defeat of his former JLI teammates (the only free heroes in the new timeline), Ted realizes that the only way to restore the timeline is to die the way he was supposed to. As Black Beetle tries to stop him, he grapples the villain and both are brought to the past in a Time Sphere. Afterwards, a shadowy figure enters an old KORD Industries storehouse, stocked with backup Blue Beetle equipment. The figure then laughs in Ted's distinct "BWA-HA-HA-HA!" style.

Blackest Night

The character's corpse gets reanimated by a Black Power Ring as a Black Lantern, and is unable to locate Booster Gold due to the latter's new time-travelling duties. He lures Booster Gold into the open by targeting Daniel Carter (Supernova) and Rose Levin, Booster Gold's 21st century ancestor. He is able to successfully pierce the Supernova costume shields with a Black Lantern BB gun, and holds Supernova in place while beating Blue Beetle (Jaime Reyes) and staving off Skeets' attack until Booster Gold arrives. He then moves in for the kill, hoping to rip out Booster Gold's heart.

He battles all of them, but is unsuccessful in killing anyone except a neighbor who complained about the noise from the fight. Jaime and Booster Gold remove Rose and Daniel from the scene and head to a KORD Industries warehouse where one of Kord's hidden bases is located to collect special equipment to fight the Black Lantern. Booster Gold discovers that even though the doors were genetically coded, someone had accessed Kord's hidden base a few months before his remains were reanimated. However to Booster Gold's knowledge, only two people, had authorization to access it: Booster Gold and Kord himself. They then head back, where Kord's corpse battles Booster Gold until he is attacked by a light blast from a gun designed by Kord himself, tuned to simulate the emotional spectrum. Separated from the ring, Booster Gold seizes his remains before the ring can reanimate them, takes them into the Time Sphere, and deposits them in a small grave at Vanishing Point Fortress.

Brightest Day
Lord gets restored to life and uses a device to amplify his own mind control powers to erase his own existence from the minds of almost everyone on the planet, and influences the superhero community into believing Ted committed suicide, which enrages Booster Gold, one of the few who could remember Max's existence as Ted's best friend. Later, Power Girl remembers Max and exhumes Ted's corpse to have Dick Grayson examine it. Dick refuses, still unconvinced about Max's existence but Batman reveal remembering Max as well. Batman and Dick examine Ted's body, which finally convinces Dick that Ted was indeed murdered.

During a battle between the Justice Society of America and Doctor Chaos in the city of Monument Point, Manhunter arrives with a team of heroes meant to help turn the tide in favor of the JSA. One of the new heroes introduced is a woman clad in a red version of Ted's Blue Beetle costume, and is shown swinging from what appears to be Ted's trademark Bug.

The New 52
Following DC's 2011 relaunch of its properties as part of its The New 52 publishing event, Ted Kord is not mentioned in comics until 2014, when he is reintroduced in the final pages of Forever Evil, DC's company-wide crossover event. At the beginning of the story, Lex Luthor threatens the owner of Kord Industries, Thomas Kord, and his entire family and company, as part of a plan to acquire the company but the helicopter loses control, and crashes into the side of LexCorp Tower. Lex later undergoes a change of heart after finding a message appearing on his phone's screen from the Crime Syndicate: "THIS WORLD IS OURS". Lex looks up to see that Thomas Kord is still alive, but dangling precariously from the helicopter's wreckage over a sheer drop to the street. He tries to save him but Ultraman accidentally causes Kord to fall to his death. Lex Luthor later promises Ted Kord (depicted as a grad student) that he will not be acquiring Kord Industries despite Ted's desire to sell it to him. Lex compliments Ted on his genius with nanotechnology and offers him his assistance should he ever need it again. Ted thanks Lex and praises him for living up to his reputation for benevolence.

DC Rebirth
In DC Universe: Rebirth, Ted Kord is the owner of Kord Industries where he makes and designs technologies. After Jaime Reyes approached Kord for help to get rid of the Scarab, Kord is trying to figure out what the Scarab can do and help as many people in the process. Kord is warned by Doctor Fate that he does not know what he's dealing with as the Scarab is not xenotechnology but magic. In Blue Beetle, Ted Kord is established to have been Blue Beetle some time in the past, having worked alongside other heroes such as Nightshade.

In Heroes in Crisis, Ted Kord as Blue Beetle breaks out Booster Gold, who is one of the main suspects of the murders at the mental health institution Sanctuary, from a cell in the Hall of Justice.

In "Doomsday Clock", Ted Kord as Blue Beetle appears alongside Nightshade, the Question, and Captain Atom in the Bug airship as they travel to Mars. There, they and many of Earth's other superheroes confront and fight Doctor Manhattan. Blue Beetle rams the Bug into Doctor Manhattan. Then, Captain Atom tells the Question to get Blue Beetle and get clear as he causes Doctor Manhattan to explode. All the superheroes are, however, defeated and incapacitated by Doctor Manhattan.

During the "Dark Nights: Death Metal" storyline, Blue Beetle was among the prisoners in New Apokolips after The Batman Who Laughs and his Dark Knights took over Prime-Earth. They were freed when Wonder Woman, Batman, and Harley Quinn freed Superman from the control of Darkfather. During the heroes fight with Robin King, Blue Beetle accompanied Red Tornado and Blue Beetle into battle against Robin King. Robin King summoned a giant beetle which killed Blue Beetle. Batman later revived him with a Black Lantern ring.

Hardcover collection
Nearly all of Ted Kord's Charlton Comics appearances as the Blue Beetle have been collected as part of the DC Archive Editions series.

The Charlton Portfolio material is in black and white as originally presented, while the rest is in color. The collection includes nearly all of the Charlton appearances of the Question, as well as a brief appearance by Captain Atom. Volume 1 of the archive contained nearly all of Captain Atom's Charlton stories and a brief appearance by Nightshade.

Powers and abilities
Ted Kord had no superpowers; he possess a genius-level intellect, with an IQ of 192. He was proficient in numerous sciences such as chemistry, physics, engineering, aircraft, and solar tech, as well as an understanding of alien tech. Despero once claimed that Ted's mind was second only to that of J'onn J'onzz. Former Justice League teammate Guy Gardner claims that Ted was smarter than Batman, "although nobody ever noticed". Kord was an Olympic-level acrobat and skilled hand-to-hand combatant, having studied in the martial arts of karate and aikido. Dick Grayson stated that Ted was very adept physically, to the point where he was almost ambidextrous. He is also highly skilled in espionage.

Equipment
 Kord created numerous gadgets, including suction pads, sight-enhancing lenses, and a protective costume. To prevent being forcibly unmasked, especially if rendered unconscious, Kord's cowl had a lock mechanism that only opened when he touched the mask under his jaw with a chip in his glove, which would at least force an enemy to perform the more troublesome task of cutting through the material to unmask him.
 He also created a power armor suit for his friend Booster Gold. The suit contained a fully functioning artificial arm and also provided life-support for Booster as he recovered from potentially fatal injuries. He later converted a suit of alien power armor for Booster to use.
 His BB gun was a handheld weapon that could blind villains with a flash of light, or knock them back with a compressed air blast capable of felling a charging rhino. The original BB gun was designed with a security feature so that it would function only when the Blue Beetle held it, becoming inactive without contact with special circuitry in the Beetle costume's gloves. The BB gun is solar powered.
 Blue Beetle's airship, the "Bug", contained high tech equipment, could electrify or magnetize its hull, fire electrical energy, and fly at 600 mph. All models had booster jets hidden under the shell of the Bug. The boosters on the first two models could speed the Bug up to the speed of sound for a short period of time; no time limit was ever given for how long the burst lasted. Later models of the boosters were used for intercontinental travel at supersonic speed. It was also 90% solar powered. Later models also had energy weapons of various types, from lasers to plasma. The last two models were capable of reaching orbit and all models could operate underwater. No depth was ever given that they could go to, but one model Bug was seen operating on the sea floor after going through an underwater volcano. All models were remotely controllable from controls built into Kord's gloves.
 He also built flight pads similar to Mister Miracle's flight discs used throughout the entire Extreme Justice run and claimed to Barbara Gordon that he could keep the Birds of Prey jet flying 24-7 with technology based on the New Gods' Mother Boxes.
 As a Black Lantern, Blue Beetle is equipped with a "decayed", damaged version of the Bug, and black, power ring-derived constructs of his Blue Beetle suit and his BB gun. This iteration of the BB gun is an aggressive, rather than a defensive, weapon, able to pierce the powerful shields in the Supernova suit.

Other versions
 Ted Kord appears in Kingdom Come as one of Batman's generals before the former is killed. Additionally, Kord was able to access the scarab, which clad him in knight-like armor.
 A Wild West-inspired incarnation of Ted Kord appears Justice Riders as an inventor who teams up with Booster Gold.
 A future incarnation of Ted Kord appears in Justice League America Annual #5. Having allowed his health and business ventures to fall apart and sold the rights to his name, the stress of these factors cause him to suffer a psychotic breakdown and attack his former team.
 An Earth-3 incarnation of Ted Kord appears in Countdown to Final Crisis.
 Several alternative incarnations of Ted Kord appear in Countdown: Arena, most prominently an anthropomorphic blue beetle named Ted who serves as the pet of Mr. and Mrs. Kord from Earth-33 who, along with Daniel Garrett of Earth-39 and the Scarab of Earth-26, are forced to fight for a role in Monarch's army. He is later devoured by the Scarab.

In other media

Television

 Ted Kord appears in the Smallville episode "Booster", portrayed by Sebastian Spence. This version did not take up the mantle of the Blue Beetle from Dan Garrett, who had died after failing to control the scarab. Kord attempts to use the device for good, but it bonds to Jaime Reyes. After Kord hires Booster Gold to help him find the scarab and locates Reyes, he agrees to help the latter control his new powers.
 Ted Kord / Blue Beetle appears in Batman: The Brave and the Bold, voiced by Wil Wheaton. This version was the owner of K.O.R.D. Industries who was unable to activate the Scarab, but succeeded Dan Garrett as the Blue Beetle regardless. Additionally, he previously worked with Batman and Booster Gold sometime prior to the series before Kord sacrificed himself to stop his villainous uncle, Jarvis Kord (voiced by Tim Matheson), from obtaining the scarab, which eventually came into Jaime Reyes' possession.
 Ted Kord / Blue Beetle makes non-speaking appearances in Young Justice. This version was a member of the Justice League who recognized the Scarab's potential dangers and used his technological genius to build inventions to use as the Blue Beetle instead. Sometime prior to the second season, Kord was attacked by Deathstroke and Sportsmaster, who sought the Scarab for the Light. However, Kord sacrificed himself to deny them the scarab, which latched onto Jaime Reyes while he was passing by.
 Ted Kord / Blue Beetle appears in season two of DC Super Hero Girls, voiced by Max Mittelman.

Film
 Ted Kord / Blue Beetle appears in DC Showcase: Blue Beetle, voiced by Matt Lanter.
 Ted Kord / Blue Beetle appears in Teen Titans Go! & DC Super Hero Girls: Mayhem in the Multiverse, voiced again by an uncredited Max Mittelman.

Video games
Ted Kord / Blue Beetle appears as an assist character in Scribblenauts Unmasked: A DC Comics Adventure.

Miscellaneous
An alternate universe incarnation of Ted Kord appears in the Injustice 2 prequel comic. This version is Jaime Reyes' mentor in becoming his successor as the Blue Beetle and a member of Batman's efforts to rebuild the world following the fall of High Councilor Superman's Regime. After being visited by Booster Gold with knowledge of his impending death, Kord reassumes the mantle of the Blue Beetle, but is attacked and abducted by the League of Assassins, who task Killer Croc and Orca with murdering him and other industrialists whose businesses have negatively impacted the environment on live television. Via a holographic message, Kord bequeaths Kord Industries to Booster and entrusts him to continue training Reyes. Additionally, a separate alternate universe version of Kord arrives to spend time with a dying Booster.

Reception
This version of Blue Beetle has been ranked as the 61st-greatest comic book character of all time IGN also ranked this version of the Blue Beetle as the 61st-greatest comic book hero of all time stating that his intelligence, his "bwahahha" antics, his endearing partnership with Booster Gold, and his brave sacrifice during the build-up to Infinite Crisis all serve to cement this particular Beetle's legacy.

References

External links
 Ted Kord Blue Beetle entry at International Catalogue of Superheroes
 Ted Kord Blue Beetle entry at Toonopedia
 DCU Guide: Blue Beetle chronology

Blue Beetle
Characters created by Steve Ditko
Comics characters introduced in 1966
DC Comics martial artists
Fictional engineers
Fictional inventors